Ole Sørensen is the name of:

Ole Sørensen (footballer) (1937–2015), Danish footballer
Ole Sørensen (politician), Danish politician and Member of the European Parliament
Ole Sørensen (sailor) (1883–1958), Norwegian Olympic gold medalist in 1920
Ole Sorensen (wrestler) (born 1948), Canadian Olympic wrestler
Ole Nørskov Sørensen (born 1952), Danish Olympic handball player

See also 
Sørensen